Saqib is the Persian pronunciation originally from the Arabic name, Thaqib (ثاقب thāqib), is a masculine given name which means "influential notion of the well-chosen, the truthful".

Notable people with this name include:
Saqib Ali (born 1975), member of Maryland House of Delegates
Saqib Ali (cricketer) (born 1978), a United Arab Emirates cricketer
Saqib Bhatti (born 1985), British Conservative politician
Saqib Hanif (born 1994), a Pakistani football player
Saqib Mahmood (born 1997), English cricketer who plays for Lancashire
Saqib Mahmood (cricketer, born 1977), English cricketer who played for Somerset
Saqib Qureshi (1947-1998), a Pakistani cricket umpire
Saqib Saleem (born 1988), an Indian film actor
Saqib Sumeer, Pakistani performer and writer
Saqib Zulfiqar (born 1997), a Dutch cricketer
Saquib Nachan, convicted criminal

See also

Pakistani masculine given names